General elections will be held in South Africa in 2024 to elect a new National Assembly as well as the provincial legislature in each province. These will be the seventh elections held under the conditions of universal adult suffrage since the end of the apartheid era in 1994. The new National Council of Provinces will be elected at the first sitting of each provincial legislature. Ever since the first post-apartheid election in 1994, the African National Congress has held a majority of seats in the National Assembly and thus governed alone, with the exceptions of the Government of National Unity from 1994 to 1999 and from 1999 through to 2004 with the Inkatha Freedom Party.

Electoral system
South Africa has a parliamentary system of government. The President of South Africa is unique among heads of state of countries with a parliamentary system in that the President is also the head of government, with executive functions.

Currently, the National Assembly has 400 members elected by a system of proportional representation with a closed list approach. Two hundred members are elected from national party lists, while the other 200 are elected from provincial party lists in each of the nine provinces. The national list seats are awarded by subtracting seats won at the provincial level from each party's national allocation to generate a maximally proportional result. The Droop quota variant of the largest remainder method is used to allocate seats at both the national and provincial levels.

In June 2020, the Constitutional Court ruled in New Nation Movement NPC v President of the Republic of South Africa that the Electoral Act was unconstitutional to the extent that it did not allow independents to contest national and provincial elections. In February 2021, Home Affairs Minister Aaron Motsoaledi appointed a ministerial advisory committee led by Valli Moosa to recommend a new electoral system. While the committee was divided, a slim majority of members favoured a hybrid system with half of the seats elected in constituencies and the other half elected through party lists.

The President of South Africa will be elected by the National Assembly following the election. Although the President is required to be a member of the National Assembly at the time of election, a person that is elected as President must resign their seat in order to assume office.

The provincial legislatures, which differ in size from 30 to 80 members, are also elected by a system of proportional representation with closed lists. The premiers of each province are elected by the respective provincial legislatures.

The National Council of Provinces (NCOP) comprises 90 members, ten elected by each of the provincial legislatures in proportion to the composition of the legislature. The NCOP members will be sworn in the day after the first sitting of the National Assembly.

Opinion polls

Notes

References

South Africa
General elections in South Africa
General